Zlitan ( Zliten) was one of the municipalities (baladiyah) of Libya from 1983 to 1995. It lay in the northwestern part of the country, on the Mediterranean coast. In 1995 most of the municipality was included as part of Misrata District, where it remains as of 2009.

Settlements 
The municipality, from 1988 to 1995 included the following settlements:

 Fawatir
 Al Huwayjat
 Al Jumah
 Mintaqat ad Daghdughi
 Naimah
 Libya Qabilat Dirsunah
 Qabilat al Fawatir
 Qabilat al Hurmah
 Qabilat al Abadilah
 Qabilat al Abadinah
 Qabilat al Ataya
 Qabilat ar Rahumat
 Qabilat ash Shutaywiyah
 Qabilat as Saqu
 Qaryat ad Dawairah
 Qaryat Hujjajah
 Qaryat al Wuqayyat
 Suq al Jumah
 Wuriran
 Zawiyat al Mahjub
 Zliten

Notes

Municipalities of Libya (1983–1995)